Arthur Edwin Way (1813 – 19 September 1870) was an English politician.

He was a Member (MP) for Bath in 1859.

References

1813 births
1870 deaths
Members of the Parliament of the United Kingdom for English constituencies
UK MPs 1859–1865